Number 17 (Swedish: Huset nr 17) is a 1949 Swedish crime film directed by Gösta Stevens and starring Edvard Persson, George Fant and Mimi Nelson. It was based on the play Number 17 by the British writer Joseph Jefferson Farjeon.

Cast
 Edvard Persson as Calle Svensson 
 George Fant as Bertil Frick 
 Mimi Nelson as Rose 
 Ulf Johanson as Henry 
 Åke Fridell as Brandt 
 Else-Marie Brandt as Vera Lindberg 
 Björn Berglund as Lindberg 
 Sture Ericson as Schmidt 
 Arne Lindblad as Old Man 
 Toivo Pawlo as Guest 
 Stig Roland as Svärd

Further reading
 Olov Qvist, Per & Von Bagh, Peter. Guide to the Cinema of Sweden and Finland. Greenwood Publishing Group, 2000.

External links
 
 

1949 films
Swedish crime films
1940s Swedish-language films
Films directed by Gösta Stevens
Swedish films based on plays
1949 crime films
Swedish black-and-white films
1940s Swedish films